Qarah Bolagh (also Romanized as Qarah Bolāgh and Qareh Bolāgh; also known as Qareh Bolāq) is a village in Akhtachi-ye Gharbi Rural District, in the Central District of Mahabad County, West Azerbaijan Province, Iran. At the 2006 census, its population was 245, in 39 families.

References 

Populated places in Mahabad County